is a Japanese female badminton player. Taruno was born in Fukuoka Prefecture, and graduated from Ishikawa Prefectural Kanazawa Koyo Kotogakko High School. She started playing badminton at aged 5, and then she joined the NTT East badminton team. In 2007, she became the runner-up at the Indonesia - Surabaya International tournament in the women's singles event. She won first international title at the 2008 Osaka International tournament, then in May 2008 she won the women's doubles event at the Smiling Fish International tournament partnered with Oku Yukina. In February 2016, she retired from the NTT East badminton team, and started her career as a coach in the United States.

Achievements

BWF International Challenge/Series 
Women's singles

Women's doubles

  BWF International Challenge tournament
  BWF International Series tournament
  BWF Future Series tournament

References

External links 
 

Living people
1988 births
Sportspeople from Fukuoka Prefecture
Japanese female badminton players
American female badminton players